Fred Smart House is a historic home in Lacona in Oswego County, New York. It was built about 1900 and is a two-story frame Queen Anne-style residence consisting of a rectangular, gabled main block with a round tower attached to each of its two front corners. Also on the property are a contributing carriage house and pergola.

It was listed on the National Register of Historic Places in 1988.

References

Houses on the National Register of Historic Places in New York (state)
Queen Anne architecture in New York (state)
Houses completed in 1900
Houses in Oswego County, New York
National Register of Historic Places in Oswego County, New York